Chad VanGaalen (born 1977) is a Canadian musician and artist from Calgary, Alberta.

Career

Infiniheart
Following a few scattered independent releases, done mostly on homemade CDs with hand-drawn art, VanGaalen released Infiniheart (2004) on Canadian independent label Flemish Eye.  Infiniheart, a collection of songs selected from recordings made in his bedroom/makeshift studio, was picked up in 2005 by indie label Sub Pop. In late 2005, the album was re-released with a bonus six-song EP entitled Green Beans.

Skelliconnection
On 22 August 2006, VanGaalen's second album, Skelliconnection, was released in the U.S. on Sub Pop and in Canada on Flemish Eye.  The album is composed of new songs as well as tracks previously released on his earlier independent recordings and features exclusive artwork and videos made by VanGaalen.

ChartAttack reported on 17 January 2007 that Skelliconnection was #31 and had been on the chart for 19 weeks.

Skelliconnection was named to shortlist on 10 July 2007 for the 2007 Polaris Music Prize. The winner was announced at a gala ceremony on 24 September 2007, with the prize going to the band Patrick Watson.

Soft Airplane 
VanGaalen's third studio album, Soft Airplane, was released 9 September 2008.  Soft Airplane marked a significant change for Vangaalen's songwriting as, unlike previous Vangaalen releases (where songs were collected from a vast catalogue of previous home recordings), Soft Airplane was written within the two-year time span since Skelliconnection.

Soft Airplane garnered many favourable reviews internationally. It was both nominated for a Canadian Juno Award for Alternative Album of the Year and shortlisted for the 2009 Polaris Music Prize. Furthermore, the album maintained a #2 placement in Exclaim!'s Top Albums of 2008 and, upon release, spent 22 weeks on !earshot's Top 50.

Vangaalen toured Soft Airplane extensively; performing live dates throughout North America, Europe, and the UK throughout 2008 and 2009. Vangaalen opted to tour with Flemish Eye label mates Women for many of his performances allowing him to utilize certain bandmembers as his backing band.

In September 2009, to celebrate the success of Soft Airplane, Vangaalen released an accessory EP for free download.

VanGaalen's song "Rabid Bits of Time", off of Soft Airplane, was featured in the trailer for the 2011 indie film Norman. His song "Bare Feet on Wet Griptape" was featured on the skateboarding video game Skate 3.

Black Mold
On 11 August 2009, VanGaalen released a full-length album Snow Blindness is Crystal Antz under the alias Black Mold.

Live shows 
VanGaalen is sometimes assisted live by Matt Flegel and Scott "Monty" Munro, both of the post-punk band Preoccupations, and drummer Eric Hamelin from No More Shapes.

Other activities 
In 2008 VanGaalen recorded the debut album of Women as well as their second album.

VanGaalen is also an illustrator and animator, and has made his own album artwork and animated music videos to accompany several of his songs, including "Clinically Dead", "Flower Gardens", "Red Hot Drops", and "Molten Light", as well as the Love as Laughter song "Dirty Lives" and Timber Timbre's song "Beat the Drum Slowly". He won the Prism Prize in 2015 for "Beat the Drum Slowly", alongside a second nomination for the video for his own single "Monster".

He has also designed album covers for other artists, including Shout Out Out Out Out's Not Saying/Just Saying.

In 2015, VanGaalen collaborated with Seth Smith of the indie rock band Dog Day on the album Seed of Dorzon.

Chad VanGaalen's Light Information, his sixth record on Sub Pop, was released on 8 September 2017.

Discography
Studio albums
2004: Infiniheart
2006: Skelliconnection
2008: Soft Airplane
2011: Diaper Island
2014: Shrink Dust
2017: Light Information
2020: Lost Harmonies
2021: World's Most Stressed Out Gardener

EPs
2005: Green Beans
2006: Skelliconnection
2009: Soft Airplane: B-Sides
2011: Your Tan Looks Supernatural

Collaboration albums
2012: Green Corridor Series #02 (with Xiu Xiu)

Black Mold
2009: Snow Blindness Is Crystal Antz

References

External links

 Chad VanGaalen official site at Flemish Eye

1977 births
Artists from Calgary
Canadian people of Flemish descent
Canadian folk singer-songwriters
Canadian rock singers
Canadian male singer-songwriters
Canadian indie rock musicians
Living people
Musicians from Calgary
Sub Pop artists
Canadian animators
Canadian music video directors
Canadian illustrators
21st-century Canadian male singers